Amphorocalyx is a genus of flowering plants belonging to the family Melastomataceae.

Its native range is Madagascar.

Species:

Amphorocalyx albus 
Amphorocalyx auratifolius 
Amphorocalyx latifolius 
Amphorocalyx multiflorus 
Amphorocalyx rupestris

References

Melastomataceae
Melastomataceae genera